Houk Spur is a bare rock spur extending from the southwest side of Mackin Table,  north of Mount Dumais, in the southern Patuxent Range of the Pensacola Mountains in Antarctica. It was mapped by the United States Geological Survey from surveys and U.S. Navy air photos, 1956–66, and was named by the Advisory Committee on Antarctic Names for Lieutenant Vernon N. Houk, U.S. Navy, officer in charge of South Pole Station in the winter of 1958.

References

Ridges of Queen Elizabeth Land